3045 Alois, provisional designation , is a carbonaceous asteroid from the outer region of the asteroid belt, approximately 26 kilometers in diameter. The asteroid was discovered on 8 January 1984, by American astronomer Joe Wagner at Lowell's Anderson Mesa Station in Flagstaff, Arizona, United States. It was named after the discoverer's grandfather Alois Stuczynski.

Orbit and classification 

Alois orbits the Sun in the outer main-belt at a distance of 2.8–3.5 AU once every 5 years and 6 months (2,023 days). Its orbit has an eccentricity of 0.11 and an inclination of 3° with respect to the ecliptic. A first precovery was taken at Palomar Observatory in 1951, extending the body's observation arc by 33 years prior to its official discovery observation at Anderson Mesa.

Physical characteristics 

The C-type body is also classified as an X-type asteroid by Pan-STARRS large-scale survey.

Rotation period 

In November 2010, a rotational lightcurve of Alois was obtained from photometric observations made at the Palomar Transient Factory, California. It gave a rotation period of  hours with a brightness amplitude of 0.18 in magnitude.

Diameter and albedo 

According to the space-based surveys by the Japanese Akari satellite and NASA's Wide-field Infrared Survey Explorer, Alois measures 23.5 and 27.5 kilometers in diameter, respectively, and has a corresponding albedo of 0.095 and 0.059. The Collaborative Asteroid Lightcurve Link assumes a standard albedo for carbonaceous asteroids of 0.057 and calculates a diameter of 26.6 kilometers.

Naming 

This minor planet was named by the discoverer in memory of his grandfather, Alois T. Stuczynski. The official naming citation was published by the Minor Planet Center on 7 March 1985.

References

External links 
 Asteroid Lightcurve Database (LCDB), query form (info )
 Dictionary of Minor Planet Names, Google books
 Asteroids and comets rotation curves, CdR – Observatoire de Genève, Raoul Behrend
 Discovery Circumstances: Numbered Minor Planets (1)-(5000) – Minor Planet Center
 
 

003045
Discoveries by Joe Wagner (astronomer)
Named minor planets
19840108